The 1997 World Taekwondo Championships were the 13th edition of the World Taekwondo Championships, and were held in Hong Kong from November 19 to November 23, 1997, with 710 athletes participating from 80 countries.

Medal summary

Men

Women

Medal table

References
 Results
WTF Medal Winners

World
World Taekwondo Championships
World Taekwondo Championships
Taekwondo Championships
Taekwondo competitions in China
Taekwondo in Hong Kong